Gudrun Lisa Johanna Brost (6 April 1910 – 28 June 1993) was a Swedish actress. She appeared in more than 40 films between 1936 and 1986.

Partial filmography

 Conscientious Objector Adolf (1936) - Woman at party (uncredited)
 Janssons frestelse (1936) - Flicka på festen (uncredited)
 Poor Millionaires (1936) - Hotel guest
 The Andersson Family (1937) - Lisa
 Stål (1940) - Aina Gouveng
 June Night (1940) - Fru Nilsson
 A Real Man (1940) - Monica (uncredited)
 Hans nåds testamente (1940) - Beda
 Fröken Kyrkråtta (1941) - Party Guest (uncredited)
 The Talk of the Town (1941) - Greta Bilt
 In Paradise (1941) - Klara
 Magistrarna på sommarlov (1941) - Elsa, servitris (uncredited)
 If I Could Marry the Minister (1941) - Helga Persson of Mon
 The Yellow Clinic (1942) - Nurse Olga
 The Heavenly Play (1942) - King Salomo's mistress
 The Sin of Anna Lans (1943) - Magda
 ...och alla dessa kvinnor (1944) - Mrs. Gordon-Brewster
 Kungliga patrasket (1945) - Hans fynd
 Man's Woman (1945) - Elin
 Lata Lena och blåögda Per (1947) - Dagmar Liljekvist
 Sven Tusan (1949) - Mrs. Winsten
 Flicka och hyacinter (1950) - Körner's Friend
 In Lilac Time (1952) - Alexandra Weijner
 Sawdust and Tinsel (1953) - Alma
 Ung man söker sällskap (1954) - Fru Boman
 Luffaren och Rasmus (1955) - Märta
 The Seventh Seal (1957) - Woman at inn (uncredited)
 The Minister of Uddarbo (1957) - Albertina, aka Gäs-Fröken
 The Virgin Spring (1960) - Frida
 Chans (1962) - Store Owner
 Ormen (1966) - Maria Sandström
 Här har du ditt liv (1966) - Olof's Stepmother
 Hour of the Wolf (1968) - Gamla Fru von Merkens
 ...som havets nakna vind (1968) - Torinna
 De många sängarna (1970) - Rut
 Ebon Lundin (1973) - Lilly
 Gangsterfilmen (1974) - Anna Nilsson
 Tabu (1977) - Linda
 Moderna människor (1983) - The grandmother
 Äntligen! (1984) - Rut

References

External links

Sculpture of Swedish Ingmar Bergman actress Gudrun Brost 
 

1910 births
1993 deaths
People from Malmö
20th-century Swedish actresses